The Latino Cultural Center in Dallas, Texas serves as a regional catalyst for the preservation, development, and promotion of Latino and Hispanic arts and culture.

The  facility, known for its vivid colors and solid exteriors, was designed by architect Ricardo Legorreta and opened in 2003. It contains a 300-seat theater, a multi-purpose room, an art gallery and sculpture courtyards that are widely used by local, regional, and international artists.

The City of Dallas Office of Cultural Affairs (OCA) operates the cultural center and supports educational classes and events for children, adults, and families that take place throughout the year.

References

External links 

 Latino Cultural Center

Arts centers in Texas
Buildings and structures in Dallas
Hispanic and Latino American culture in Texas
Cultural centers in the United States
Culture of Dallas
Tourist attractions in Dallas
Ricardo Legorreta buildings
Postmodern architecture in Texas